Arkady Maksimovich Abaza (Абаза́ Арка́дий Макси́мович; 1843 in Sverdlikovo, Kursk Governorate – , in Kursk) was a Russian composer, journalist and pianist. He studied in St. Petersburg with Alexander Dreyschock for fortepiano and singing in the class of Camille Everardi. Later he was an associate of Hans von Bulow. He taught and was director of a music school in Sumy (1877–81) and then in Kursk (1882–1915). Among his students, at Kursk, was Nikolai Roslavets.

His most famous song is "Foggy Morning" (Утро туманное) to lyrics of Ivan Turgenev.

References

1843 births
1915 deaths
People from Sudzhansky District
People from Sudzhansky Uyezd
Composers from the Russian Empire
Russian male composers